Cheap Thrills is the sixth studio album by the American country music band Confederate Railroad. It was issued by Shanachie in 2007. The album is composed of cover songs by country music and Southern rock artists.

Michael Sudhalter of Country Standard Time gave the album a generally positive review, saying that the album showed the band's Southern rock and honky-tonk influences. He thought that the covers of Alan Jackson and Joe Diffie songs were "lowlights".

Track listing
"11 Months and 29 Days" (Johnny Paycheck, Billy Sherrill) – 3:30
"Hard Livin'" (David Halley) – 3:05
"Don't Rock the Jukebox" (Alan Jackson, Keith Stegall, Roger Murrah) – 2:52
"Whiskey on Ice" (Hank Williams, Jr., Tony Stampley, Bobby Keel) – 2:48
"Cheap Thrills" (Bob McDill) – 3:25
"Georgia on a Fast Train" (Billy Joe Shaver) – 3:12
"Honky Tonk Heroes" (Shaver) – 3:43
"Trudy" (Charlie Daniels) – 4:43
"Please Come to Boston" (Dave Loggins) – 4:20
"New Way (To Light Up an Old Flame)" (Joe Diffie, Lonnie Wilson) – 2:45
"I Know a Little" (Steve Gaines) – 3:37

Personnel

Confederate Railroad
 Jimmy Dormire - electric guitar
 Mark Dufresne - drums
 Cody McCarver - keyboards, background vocals
 Gates Nichols - dobro, steel guitar
 Wayne Secrest - bass guitar
 Danny Shirley - acoustic guitar, lead vocals

Additional Musicians
 Mark Beckett - drums, percussion
 James Fletcher - electric guitar
 Tony Harrell - piano, Hammond organ, Wurlitzer
 Blue Miller - acoustic guitar, electric guitar, background vocals

References

2007 albums
Confederate Railroad albums
Shanachie Records albums